Chicago Board of Trade is a colour photograph made by German artist Andreas Gursky in 1997. It is the original picture that he took of the Chicago Board of Trade, of which he would make new versions in 1999 and in 2009. The photograph had six editions, one of which is at The Broad Museum, in Los Angeles. It is also a part of a series that the artist made on the subject of stock exchanges and board of trades across the world, since 1990.

The picture has the large format of 185,42 by 241,94 cm. In this original version the space depicted is larger, showing also the surrounding area, including the balconies, of the Chicago Board of Trade, who would be cropped in the following versions.

This first version was sold by $2,507,755 at Sotheby's, London, on 24 June 2013, making it one of the most expensive photographs ever sold.

References

Color photographs
Photographs by Andreas Gursky
1997 in art
1990s photographs
Collection of The Broad